Kiezdeutsch is a variety of German spoken primarily by youth in urban spaces in which a high percentage of the population is multilingual and has an immigration background. Since the 1990s, Kiezdeutsch has come into the public eye as a multiethnic language.

Definition 
The term "Kiezdeutsch" originated among youth in the Kreuzberg district of Berlin who used it to describe their language use amongst themselves. In 2006, it was used in an essay by linguist Heike Wiese and subsequently became an established term within the academy as well as the public sphere. Previously used terms include "Gemischt-sprechen" (mixed-speaking), "Türkendeutsch" (Turkish German), "Ghettodeutsch" (ghetto German), and "Kanak Sprak" (Kanake language, a reappropriated pejorative).

The term Kiezdeutsch avoided negative connotations and does not limit the language group to a particular ethnicity. Additionally, it makes clear that it is both a variety of German and an informal style of speech used in the "Kiez" (a term which in Berlin German refers to an urban neighborhood).

Classification 
Linguist Norbert Dittmar classifies Kiezdeutsch as an ethnolect and claims only spoken ethnolectal use was documented up to 2007. Eva Wittenberg defines Kiezdeutsch more concretely as a multi-ethnolectal German youth language.

Heike Wiese argues that Kiezdeutsch should be considered a "new dialect" due to its use amongst youth of various ethnic groups in urban areas with high proportions of immigrants. This  has been critiqued by Germanist Helmut Glück, who argues that a dialect always refers to a historically rooted way of speaking characteristic of a particular region (rather than with a particular ethnic and age groups). He draws comparisons to Ruhrdeutsch, influenced by Polish immigration, and claims Kiezdeutsch is similarly most appropriately labelled a sociolect.

Grammatic and lexical features 
Kiezdeutsch deviates in a variety of ways from Standard German and features a number of grammatical and lexical innovations. It is regularly subject to vehement criticism and described by some as broken or error-ridden German. A statement of the German Society for Linguistics disputes these criticisms, however. Linguists argue that like other variants of German, the use of Kiezdeutsch does not indicate poor language competencies. Instead, among its speakers, Kiezdeutsch is a single piece of a large spoken repertoire that also includes formal manners of speaking such as Standard German. The grammatic characteristics detailed below are used particularly in informal peer-group situations and signify affiliation with a particular community.

Shortening of nominal phrases 
One of the most prominent features of Kiezdeutsch is the use of shortened nominal phrases (without articles or prepositions) as place and time markers:

"Gehst du heute auch Viktoriapark?" (Are you also going Victoria Park today?)

"Ich werde zweiter Mai fünfzehn." (I will turn 15 2 May)

In the above examples, the prepositions "zum" (to the) and "am" (on the) have been omitted, but do not impact sentence meaning. Shortened phrases of this nature are often perceived as unsystematic linguistic simplifications. However, a similar phenomenon occurs in standard German in informal spoken contexts (for instance, in the region of Berlin shortened nominal phrases are regularly used to designate public transit stops).

Shortening of functional words and inflectional endings 
Functional words and inflectional endings, particular those that can be inferred, are often shortened or dropped:

"Ich habe eine Blase am Fuß. Tut weh." (I have a blister on my foot. Hurts.)

In the above example, the subject ("it") has been dropped from the second sentence as it is implied.

Word order variations 
In Kiezdeutsch, as in Standard German, verbs can be placed in the second-position in declarative clauses and in the last-position in subordinate clauses. However, unlike Standard German, Kiezdeutsch allows for verbs to also be placed in the first- and third-positions:

"Ich wusste ganz genau, dass er das versteht und darum hab ich das auch gesagt, aber jetzt ich hasse ihn."

In the above example, "jetzt ich hasse ihn" places the verb hasse in the third-position. In Standard German, the verb would occupy the second-position: Jetzt hasse ich ihn.

Development of new grammatical particles 
In Kiezdeutsch, constructions featuring two new grammatical particles can be found: "musstu" and "lassma":

"Musstu Doppelstunde fahren!" (rather than: Du musst Doppelstunde fahren!)

"Lassma Moritzplatz aussteigen" (rather than: "Lass uns mal Moritzplatz aussteigen.")

Although musstu is based on the second-person phrase "musst du," it can also be used when referring to groups of people. In these instances, Standard German would require the use of "müsst ihr."

Use of "so" as an emphasis marker 
The particle "so" is frequently used as an emphasis marker. While this usage can also be seen outside of Kiezdeutsch, it is much less common in monolingual than multilingual contexts:

"Dicker, ich hab, ich weiß nicht, also die Stadt ist nicht mein Dings so. Weißt, was ich meine? Ich bin mehr so Naturtyp für Natur, Dorf. So im Grünen, das ist mein Ding."

"Ich höre Alpa Gun, weil er so aus Schöneberg kommt." (emphasizing "aus Schöneberg")

"Die hübschesten Frauen kommen von den Schweden, also ich mein, so blond so." (emphasizing "blond")

Introduction of foreign words 
New foreign words are integrated from heritage languages such as Turkish and Arabic, but also American English. These foreign words are used following the rules of German grammar and their pronunciation is Germanized. They are used to the same degree by speakers with varying language backgrounds (for instance, Arabic words used by speakers with no Arabic background).

Coronalization of the "ich-Laute" 
On a phonological level, the coronalization of the voiceless palatal fricative is noteworthy. This is also known to occur in dialects from the Rhineland.

Linguistic studies 
There have been numerous linguistic studies of Kiezdeutsch that investigate both sociolinguistic and grammar.

Sociolinguistic themes such as group-specifics, identity construction, and media stylization are addressed in Inken Keim's study of the speaking patterns of a bilingual German-Turkish group of girls in Mannheim, Heike Weise's essays on the construction of social groups, and the work of Peter Auer, Jannis Androutsopoulos, and Helga Kotthoff on the adoption of Kiezdeutsch amongst monolingual speakers and its medial transformation. Newer studies concern themselves with the speaking repertoire of Kiezdeutsch speakers and related register differences. Additionally, a central focus the sociolinguistic investigation of Kiezdeutsch is an assessment of the linguistic attitudes of both Kiezdeutsch speakers and broader society. In the area of application, there are multiple studies on Kiezdeutsch use in schools, particularly suggestions for integrating it into German language instruction.

In the area of grammar, the majority of research focuses on the phonetics, phonology, and syntax of Kiezdeutsch. Researchers interested in phonetics and phonology include Selting & Kern (2009), Jannedy et al. (2011), Šimšek (2012), Kern (2013), and Jannedy & Weirich (2014). Syntactic studies are often concerned with the third-position placement of verbs in imperative sentences as well as shortened nominal and prepositional phrases. Heike Wiese has is the foremost researcher on the creation of new particles.

Kiezdeutsch Corpus (KiDKo) 
A comprehensive collection of conversations in Kiezdeutsch is available via the Kiezdeutsch Corpus (Kiezdeutschkorpus, or KiDKo). The KiDKo was developed between 2008 and 2015 through a project at the University of Potsdam.

The corpus, which is freely accessible and online, is based in part on audio recordings of youth in a multiethnic neighborhood (Berlin-Kreuzberg) amongst their friend circle during their free time. Another section of the corpus is based on youth in a monoethnic neighborhood with comparable socioeconomic conditions (Berlin-Hellersdorf). That allows for comparative study. The recordings were made in 2008 and are available as written transcripts.

The corpus is linguistically annotated. In addition to the literal transcript, it includes an orthographically normalized form (partly consisting of translations from Turkish), part of speech tagging, as well as syntactic information. The transcripts are linked to their audio files. All data is anonymized.

Further reading 

 Jannis Androutsopoulos: From the Streets to the Screens and Back Again. On the mediated diffusion of ethnolectal patterns in contemporary German. LAUD, Essen 2001.
 Jannis Androutsopoulos: Ethnolekte in der Mediengesellschaft. Stilisierung und Sprachideologie in Performance, Fiktion und Metasprachdiskurs. In: Christian Fandrych, Reiner Salverda (Hrsg.): Standard, Variation und Sprachwandel in germanischen Sprachen / Standard, Variation and Language Change in Germanic Languages. Narr, Tübingen 2007, S. 113–155.
 Peter Auer: ‚Türkenslang': Ein jugendsprachlicher Ethnolekt des Deutschen und seine Transformationen. In: Annelies Häcki Buhofer (Hrsg.): Spracherwerb und Lebensalter. Francke, Tübingen 2003, S. 255–264.
 İnci Dirim, Peter Auer: Türkisch sprechen nicht nur die Türken. Über die Unschärfebeziehung zwischen Sprache und Ethnie in Deutschland; de Gruyter, Berlin / New York 2004, doi:10.1515/9783110919790.
 Lena Ekberg, Toril Opsahl, Heike Wiese: Functional gains: A cross-linguistic case study on three particles in Swedish, Norwegian, and German. In: Jacomine Nortier, Bente A. Svendsen (Hrsg.): Language, Youth and Identity in the 21st Century. Linguistic Practices across Urban Spaces. Cambridge University Press, Cambridge 2015, S. 93–115, doi:10.1017/CBO9781139061896.007.
 H. Julia Eksner: Ghetto Ideologies, Youth Identities and Stylized Turkish German Turkish Youth in Berlin-Kreuzberg. Lit Verlag, Berlin 2001.
 Ulrike Freywald, Leonie Cornips, Natalia Ganuza, Ingvild Nistov, Toril Opsahl: Beyond verb second – a matter of novel information structural effects? Evidence from Norwegian, Swedish, German and Dutch. In: Jacomine Nortier, Bente A. Svendsen (Hrsg.): Language, Youth and Identity in the 21st Century. Linguistic Practices across Urban Spaces. Cambridge University Press, Cambridge 2015, S. 73–92, doi:10.1017/CBO9781139061896.006.
 Stefanie Jannedy, Melanie Weirich, Jana Brunner: . In: Wai Sum Lee, Eric Zee (Hrsg.): . City University of Hong Kong, Hongkong 2011, OCLC 862406470, S. 962–965 (Download des Artikels [PDF; 305 kB; retrieved 6 April 2021]).
 Stefanie Jannedy, Melanie Weirich: Sound change in an urban setting: Category instability of the palatal fricative in Berlin. In: Laboratory Phonology. 5, 1, 2014, S. 91–122, doi:10.1515/lp-2014-0005.
 Werner Kallmeyer, Inken Keim: Linguistic variation and the construction of social identity in a German-Turkish setting. A case study of an immigrant youth-group in Mannheim, Germany. In: Jannis Androutsopoulos, Alexandra Georgakopoulou (Hrsg.): Discourse Constructions of Youth Identities. Benjamins, Amsterdam / Philadelphia 2003, S. 29–46, doi:10.1075/pbns.110.03kal, online.
 Friederike Kern: Rhythmus und Kontrast im Türkischdeutschen. de Gruyter, Berlin / Boston 2013, doi:10.1515/9783110296532.
 Friederike Kern, Margret Selting: Einheitenkonstruktion im Türkendeutschen: Grammatische und prosodische Aspekte. In: Zeitschrift für Sprachwissenschaft. Bd. 25, 2006, S. 239–272, doi:10.1515/ZFS.2006.009.
 Helga Kotthoff: Ethno-Comedy und riskanter Humor in der Clique. Rassistisch, einfach spaßig oder besonders cool? In: Barbara Lewandowska-Tomaszczyk, Hanna Pulaczewska (Hrsg.): Cross-Cultural Europe: Issues in Identity and Communication. ibidem, München 2010, S. 145–181.
 Helga Kotthoff: Alles nur ein Scherz? Über humoristische Diskriminierung. In: Peter Maitz, Stefan Elspaß (Hrsg.): Der Deutschunterricht. 6, Themenheft zur sprachlichen Diskriminierung, 2011, S. 74–86.
 Philipp Krämer: Delegitimising creoles and multiethnolects: stereotypes and (mis-)con-ceptions of language in online debates. (PDF; 711 kB). In: Caribbean Studies. 45, 1–2, 2017, S. 107–142.
 Ines Rehbein, Sören Schalowski: STTS goes Kiez – Experiments on Annotating and Tagging Urban Youth Language. In: Journal for Language Technology and Computational Linguistics. Bd. 28, 2013, S. 199–227 (Themenheft Das STTS-Tagset für Wortartentagging – Stand und Perspektiven).
 Ines Rehbein, Sören Schalowski, Heike Wiese: The KiezDeutsch Korpus (KiDKo) Release 1.0. In: Proceedings of the 9th International Conference on Language Resources and Evaluation (LREC). 24–31 May 2014. Island, Reykjavik 2013.
 Margret Selting, Friederike Kern: On some syntactic and prosodic structures of Turkish German in talk-in-interaction. In: Journal of Pragmatics. Bd. 41, 2009, S. 2496–2514.
 Yazgül Šimšek: Sequenzielle und prosodische Aspekte der Sprecher-Hörer-Interaktion im Türkendeutschen. Waxmann, Berlin 2012.
 John R. te Velde: Temporal adverbs in the kiezdeutsch left periphery: Combining late merge with deaccentuation for V3. In: Studia Linguistica. 71, 3, 2016, S. 205–367, doi:10.1111/stul.12055
 George Walkden: Language contact and V3 in Germanic varieties new and old. In: Journal of Comparative Germanic Linguistics. Bd. 20, 2017, S. 49–81.
 Heike Wiese: „Ich mach dich Messer" – Grammatische Produktivität in Kiez-Sprache (‚Kanak Sprak'). In: Linguistische Berichte. Bd. 207, 2006, S. 245–273.
 Heike Wiese: Grammatical innovation in multiethnic urban Europe: new linguistic practices among adolescents. In: Lingua. 119, 5, 2009, S. 782–806.
 Heike Wiese: . C. H. Beck, München 2012, doi:10.17104/9783406630354.
 Heike Wiese: Voices of linguistic outrage: standard language constructs and the discourse on new urban dialects. In: Working Papers in Urban Language and Literacies. 120 (ed. Ben Rampton et al.). King's College, London 2014.
 Heike Wiese: Die Konstruktion sozialer Gruppen. Fallbeispiel Kiezdeutsch. In: Eva Neuland, Peter Schlobinski (Hrsg.): Handbuch Sprache in sozialen Gruppen. de Gruyter, Berlin / Boston 2018, S. 331–351.
 Heike Wiese, Ulrike Freywald, Sören Schalowski, Katharina Mayr: Das KiezDeutsch-Korpus. Spontansprachliche Daten Jugendlicher aus urbanen Wohngebieten. In: Deutsche Sprache. Bd. 40, 2012, S. 97–123.
 Heike Wiese, Horst J. Simon, Marianne Zappen-Thomson, Kathleen Schumann: Mehrsprachiges Deutsch: Beobachtungen zu Namdeutsch und Kiezdeutsch. In: Zeitschrift für Dialektologie und Linguistik. 81, 3, 2014, S. 247–307.
 Heike Wiese, Maria Pohle: „Ich geh Kino" oder „... ins Kino"? Gebrauchsrestriktio-nen nichtkanonischer Lokalangaben. In: Zeitschrift für Sprachwissenschaft. Bd. 35, 2016, S. 171–216.
 Heike Wiese, Katharina Mayr, Philipp Krämer, Patrick Seeger, Hans-Georg Müller, Verena Mezger: Changing teachers' attitudes towards linguistic diversity: Effects of an antibias programme. In: International Journal of Applied Linguistics. 2017, onlinelibrary.wiley.com (PDF)
 Heike Wiese, Hans G. Müller: The hidden life of V3: an overlooked word order variant on verb-second. In: Mailin Antomo, Sonja Müller (Hrsg.): Non-Canonical Verb Positioning in Main Clauses. Buske, Hamburg 2018, S. 201–223 (Linguistische Berichte, Sonderheft 25).
 Amir Zeldes, Julia Ritz, Anke Lüdeling, Christian Chiarcos: ANNIS: A search tool for multi-layer annotated corpora. In: Proceedings of the Corpus Linguistics Conference. 20–23 July 2009. Liverpool UK 2009, ucrel.lancs.ac.uk

External links 

 kiezdeutsch.de
 kiezdeutschkorpus.de
 www.deutsch-ist-vielseitig.de (materials for teaching about Kiezdeutsch)

Works cited 

German dialects
German language
German youth culture
Turkish youth culture
Turkish diaspora in Germany
City colloquials